All 'n All is the eighth studio album by the American band Earth, Wind & Fire, released in November 1977 by Columbia Records. The album reached No. 1 on the Billboard Top R&B/Hip-Hop Albums chart and No. 3 on the Billboard 200 chart.
All 'n All has also been certified Triple Platinum in the US by the RIAA, Gold in Canada by Music Canada and Silver in the UK by the BPI.

All 'n All was produced by Maurice White for Kalimba Productions. His inspiration for the album was a month-long trip to Argentina and Brazil.

Singles
"Serpentine Fire" reached number one on the Billboard Hot Soul Songs chart and number 13 on the Billboard Hot 100. Another single, "Fantasy", peaked at number 12 on the Billboard Hot Soul Songs chart and number 14 on the UK Pop Singles chart. "Fantasy" also earned a Grammy nomination for Best R&B Song.

Critical reception

The Guardian found that "Maurice White began his career as a drummer, and his band can sound like one enormous kit, where every crash and beat has its funky place." He added "I'll Write a Song for You is superior schmaltz; and the whole shebang is punctuated beautifully by Milton Nascimento's Brazilian Rhyme". Joe McEwen of Rolling Stone found that "As on past Earth, Wind and Fire records, All ‘n All is filled with leaded brotherhood platitudes, Star Trek sci-fi and stiffly poetic love songs. This sounds overwrought and depressing (and maybe it is). But there’s a catch: I like the record, for like much current black music, All ‘n All elicits a schizophrenic response. If the album represents some of the worst in black music, it also has more than its share of the best." The Los Angeles Times wrote "All n All includes only two ballads and for a change both are as nifty as the R&B rockers. EW&F's finest collection". Robert Christgau of the Village Voice gave a B+ grade and wrote "Focusing soulful horns, high-tension harmonies, and rhythms and textures from many lands onto a first side that cooks throughout. Only one element is lacking. Still, unsympathetic as I am to lyrics about conquering the universe on wings of thought, they make me shake my fundament anyway."
Alex Henderson of AllMusic described the album as a "diverse jewel". With a four out of five star rating Barry Cain of Record Mirror claimed that on All n' All "the spirit of Maurice White reigns supreme. The singer/writer /producer casts his giant bird like shadow across every note, every peerless piece of slickery, every eye - blinking device. If anyone can claim to be the Fellini of funk It's Maurice White." Cain added "It's an EW&F album and I like it. Unashamedly." Phyl Garland of Stereo Review said "The music is delightfully earthy in
its appeal, an aural collage of rich vocal and instrumental textures underscored by highly danceable rhythms that never
surrender to triteness. Though the very name of this group partakes of astro-logical symbolism, and though the lyrics of their songs often hint of galactic mysteries, the nine men who compose Earth, Wind & Fire play a kind of music that might be called neo-progressive soul, for it is a full light-year beyond
what most groups are doing these days, soaring to celestial heights while sending out waves of mundane thrills." John Rockwell of The New York Times proclaimed "All 'n All shows Maurice White and his cohorts pushing their music ever more in a febrile jazz‐rock direction. There are parallels, here, to white rock groups like Queen and Yes, but the very sophistication and single‐mindedness of Earth, Wind and Fire's vision sets it apart from the bulk of rock‐and‐roll." Monroe Anderson of The Chicago Tribune also found that "The soul group's latest album release, All 'N All (Columbia), is a rare blend of poetry, passion, and artistic progression." Anderson added "All N All is a nice indication that EW&F is trying to expose its fans to other forms of American music and take them across international and cultural borders."

As an album, All 'n All won a Grammy for Best R&B Vocal Performance By A Duo, Group Or Chorus. "Runnin" also won a Grammy Award for Best R&B Instrumental. 
Additionally, All 'n All was nominated for an American Music Award in the category of Favorite Soul/R&B Album.

Track listing

Original release

1999 Legacy reissue (CK 65738)

Personnel 

Dorothy Ashby – harp
Phil Ayling – flute
Philip Bailey – vocals, percussion, congas
Blanche Belnick – violin
Roger Bobo – tuba
George Bohanon – trombone
Oscar Brashear – trumpet
Garnett Brown – trombone
Ronald Clark – violin
Ronald Cooper – cello
Paulinho Da Costa – percussion
Eduardo del Barrio – piano
Eumir Deodato - horn arrangement, string arrangement (7, 10)
Warren Dewey - additional recording engineer 
David Duke – French horn
Larry Dunn – assistant producer, piano, Moog synthesizer, Oberheim synthesizer 
Chuck Findley – trumpet
Norman Forrest – viola
Harris Goldman – violin
Jack Gootkin – violin
Janice Gower – violin, concertmaster
Johnny Graham – guitar solo (5), additional guitars
Terry Harrington – flute
Michael Harris - trumpet solo (9), additional trumpets
Ruth Henry – violin
Fred Jackson, Jr. – flute
Ralph Johnson – drums
Jan Kelly – cello
Richard Klein – French horn
Paul Klingberg – audio mixing (12-14)
Renita Koven – viola
Betty LaMagna – violin
Carl LaMagna – violin
Mary D. Lindquist – violin
Linda Lipsett – viola
Art Macnow – direction
Steve Madaio – trumpet
Cameron Marcarelli – mixing assistant (12-14)
George Massenburg – recording engineer
James M. McGee – French horn
Al McKay – guitar solo (9), additional guitars
Abe Most – flute
Don Myrick – saxophone solo (9), alto saxophone, tenor saxophone, baritone saxophone
Susan Ranney – acoustic bass
Alan Robinson – French horn
Gale Robinson – French horn
Marilyn Robinson – French horn
Jack Rouben - assistant recording engineer 
Meyer Rubin – acoustic bass
Leo Sacks – audio mixing (12-14), reissue producer
Richard Salvato – direction
Sheldon Sanov – violin
Louis Satterfield – trombone
Skip Scarborough – piano
Haim Shtrum – violin
Daniel Smith – cello
Barry Socher – violin
Lya Stern – violin
David Stockhammer – violin
Barbara Thomason – viola
Tom Tom 84 - horn arrangement, string arrangement
Marcia Van Dyke – violin
Fred White – drums
Maurice White – audio mixing (12-14), original recording producer, vocals, drums, kalimba
Verdine White – assistant producer, vocals, electric bass
Mark Wilder – mastering
Andrew Woolfolk – tenor saxophone

Charts and certifications

Charts

Albums

Year-end charts

Singles

Certifications

Accolades
The information regarding accolades attributed to All 'n All is adapted from Acclaimed Music.

(*) designates lists that are unordered.

See also 
List of number-one R&B albums of 1977 (U.S.)
List of number-one R&B albums of 1978 (U.S.)

References 

1977 albums
Earth, Wind & Fire albums
Albums produced by Maurice White
Columbia Records albums
Albums with cover art by Shusei Nagaoka